Act of Murder is a 2010 novel by the English writer Alan Wright.  It won the Dundee International Book Prize, the largest monetary British Prize for first novels, in 2010, and was published by Polygon Books. It is a historical murder mystery set in 1894.

The Courier described the novel as a "skillfully-executed tale" that was "particularly touching and full of pathos."

See also
 2010 in literature
 Scottish literature

References

2010 British novels
English-language novels
Fiction set in 1894
Novels set in the 1890s
Historical mystery novels
2010 debut novels
Polygon Books books